Microcastalia is a genus of metallic wood-boring beetles in the family Buprestidae. There are at least two described species in Microcastalia.

Species
These two species belong to the genus Microcastalia.
 Microcastalia globithorax (Thomson, 1878)
 Microcastalia scintillans (Carter, 1924)

References

Further reading

 
 
 
 
 
 
 

Buprestidae